Chemung may refer to places in the United States:

Illinois
Chemung, Illinois
Chemung Township, McHenry County, Illinois

New York
Chemung Canal, a former canal connecting Seneca Lake at Watkins Glen to the Chemung River at Elmira
Chemung Canal Trust Company, a New York State chartered trust company based in Elmira
Chemung County, New York
Chemung, New York, a town in Chemung County
Chemung Railroad
Chemung River, a tributary of the Susquehanna River
Chemung Speedrome, a 1/4 mile Asphalt race track in Chemung

Pennsylvania
Chemung, Pennsylvania

See also

USS Chemung